Bethesda is an unincorporated community in Lancaster County, in the U.S. state of Pennsylvania.

History
A post office called Bethesda was established in 1857, and remained in operation until it was discontinued in 1904. The community was named after the Pool of Bethesda, a place mentioned in the Bible.

References

Unincorporated communities in Lancaster County, Pennsylvania
1857 establishments in Pennsylvania
Unincorporated communities in Pennsylvania